Chance M Glenn Sr. is a provost and vice president for academic affairs at University of Houston-Victoria. and former dean of the College of Engineering, Technology and Physical Sciences at Alabama A&M University in Huntsville. He is also serving as a president and executive director of the Alabama A&M University Research, Innovation, Science and Engineering Foundation.

Education 
Glenn received his Bachelor of Science degree in electrical engineering from the University of Maryland at College Park. He then received his Master of Science degree and Doctor of Philosophy degree, both in electrical engineering, from The Johns Hopkins University Whiting School of Engineering.

Career 
Chance Glenn Sr. began his engineering career at the Army Research Laboratory in Adelphi, Maryland where he designed microwave and radio frequency devices for a wide range of defense-related applications. There he also became involved in signal processing and the study of nonlinear dynamical systems. He began publishing, presenting, and submitting patent applications even before completing his undergraduate studies. He left Army Research Lab started Syncrodyne Systems Corporation to develop new commercial technologies using nonlinear dynamics as a foundation.

In 2003, Glenn joined the Rochester Institute of Technology as a tenure professor and, 2008 he becomes associated dean of graduate studies. He was the founding director of the William G. McGowan Center for Telecommunications, Innovation and Collaborative Research. He joined the Alabama A&M University in Huntsville, Alabama as a Dean of the College of Engineering, Technology, and Physical Sciences in 2012.

Research interest

He has 10 patents & patent applications and 30+ research grant activities. He has also served in many reviewer activities. He is also leading efforts to grow research in artificial intelligence, cyber security, materials science, image and signal processing, alternative energy, and other areas of major global significance.

Personal life 
Glenn is married to Marsha Glenn.  They have four children, Michael, Chance, Rebecca, and Morgen.

Glenn is an avid singer and songwriter.  He has written and published over one hundred songs and recorded two albums.  One of his songs was nominated for a Grammy award in 2000.

References

External links
College of Engineering, Technology and Physical Sciences at Alabama A&M University
Alabama A&M University Research, Innovation, Science and Engineering Foundation

University of Maryland, College Park alumni
Johns Hopkins University alumni
University of Houston System
University of Houston System people
Victoria, Texas
Living people
African Americans and education
Year of birth missing (living people)